The Princess of Urbino (German: Die Prinzessin von Urbino) is a 1919 German silent crime film directed by Paul Legband and starring Ria Jende, Eduard Rothauser and Hans Albers.

References

Bibliography
 Hans-Michael Bock and Tim Bergfelder. The Concise Cinegraph: An Encyclopedia of German Cinema. Berghahn Books, 2009.

External links

1919 films
Films of the Weimar Republic
German silent feature films
Films directed by Paul Legband
German black-and-white films
German crime films
1919 crime films
1910s German films
1910s German-language films